Monica Maria "Monique" Pronk (born 4 August 1958) is a retired Dutch rowing coxswain. She competed at the 1976 and 1980 Olympics in the coxed fours and quad sculls and finished in fifth and sixth place, respectively.

References

1958 births
Living people
Coxswains (rowing)
Dutch female rowers
Olympic rowers of the Netherlands
Rowers at the 1976 Summer Olympics
Rowers at the 1980 Summer Olympics
Rowers from Amsterdam